St Vincent's Hospital is a health facility in Gynack Road, Kingussie, Scotland. It is managed by NHS Highland.

History
The facility, which was founded by Dr de Watteville, opened as the Grampian Sanatorium in 1901. It was acquired by the Sisters of Charity of Saint Vincent de Paul and only joined the National Health Service in 1986. In February 2015, it was announced that the hospital would close once a new health centre in Aviemore had been completed.

References

NHS Scotland hospitals
1901 establishments in Scotland
Hospitals established in 1901
Hospitals in Highland (council area)
Hospital buildings completed in 1901